George Mirabal is a former mayor of Bell, California.

Mirabal was elected to the Bell City Council in 1986 and served his first term as mayor in 1988–1989. He served as the City Clerk before being appointed to the council once again to finish the term of Jay Price, who died during his term.

Mirabal was sentenced July 11, 2014, to serve one year in the Los Angeles County jail, five years probation, and 1000 hours of community service for misappropriating public funds.  He was also ordered to pay $242,293 in restitution to the city.

In June 2015, the California Public Employees Retirement System (CalPERS) Board adopted an administrative law judge's decision reducing the "final compensation" that city of Bell had reported for Mr. Mirabal - and which would have been the basis for computing his pension - from $8,083 per month to $673 per month.

References

Mayors of places in California
People from Bell, California
Living people
Year of birth missing (living people)